Richard Hope may refer to:

Richard Hope (actor), British actor
Richard Hope (footballer) (born 1978), English footballer
Dick Hope, Scottish footballer